Sorkheh Dizaj, also rendered as Sorkh Dizaj, may refer to:
 Sorkheh Dizaj, East Azerbaijan
 Sorkheh Dizaj, Abhar, Zanjan Province
 Sorkheh Dizaj, Tarom, Zanjan Province